Dogman or Dog Man may refer to:

Arts and entertainment
Dog Man, a comedic graphic novel series by Dav Pilkey
Dogman (children's musical), by John Dowie
Dogman (album), a 1994 album by King's X
"Dogman" (song), a song from album
"Dogman", a song by  Trash Talk from the 2012 album 119
Dogman (film), a 2018 Italian crime drama film
Dogman, a character created by Gillie and Marc

Folklore and mythology
Beast of Bray Road
Michigan Dogman
Weredog, a canine therianthropic creature

Jobs
Dogman, a person who raises dogs for dog fighting
Dogman, who directs crane operations, banksman, in Australia and New Zealand 
Dogman, a steelwork erector ironworker
Dog man, a slang term for a police dog handler in British police forces